Westminster Bank was a British retail bank which operated in England and Wales from 1834 until its merger into the National Westminster Bank in 1970; it continued to exist as a dormant registered non-trading company until 4 July 2017 when it was dissolved. Considered one of the Big Five, it expanded during the nineteenth and twentieth centuries and took over a number of smaller banking companies.

History

London and Westminster Bank
In 1834, the London and Westminster Bank was the first firm founded under the auspices of the Bank Charter Act 1833, which allowed joint-stock banks to be established in the capital. For various reasons, the press, private banking concerns, and the Bank of England were so hostile to the Bank Charter Act that London and Westminster's management was primarily concerned with defending the company's right to exist rather than setting up an extensive branch network. As a result, the bank opened only six London branches in its first three years and no additional offices were established until nearly 20 years later.

London and Westminster made its first acquisition in 1847, when it bought Young & Son. In about 1870 it acquired Unity Joint-Stock Bank, and mergers with Commercial Bank of London and Middlesex Bank had been arranged in 1861 and 1863 respectively. By 1909 London and Westminster had opened or acquired 37 branches in and around London. Yet, despite this expansion effort, the bank felt the effects of competition from provincial banks like Lloyds and Midland. These two banks had already established large regional branch networks and were quickly encroaching upon the London market. In order to meet this challenge, in 1909, London and Westminster merged with the influential and prestigious London and County Bank, which had seventy offices citywide and almost two hundred in rural counties.

London and County Bank
The Surrey, Kent and Sussex Banking Company had been established at Southwark in 1836 and soon had branches in places like Croydon, Brighton, Maidstone and Woolwich. It was renamed the London and County Banking Co. in 1839. By 1875 it had over 150 branches and was the largest British bank. The resulting entity was named the London County and Westminster Bank. Prior to the merger, London and County had already taken over the business of the following banks:

London County and Westminster Bank

In 1913, the bank formed a subsidiary, London County and Westminster Bank (Paris), which opened branches during and after World War I in Bordeaux (1917), Lyon (1918), Marseilles (1918) and Nantes (1919). The bank itself also directly established offices in Madrid (1917), Barcelona (1917), Antwerp (1919), Brussels (1919), Bilbao (1919) and Valencia (1920).

These operations were converted into a foreign bank in 1920 and renamed London County Westminster and Parrs Foreign Bank, becoming Westminster Foreign Bank in 1923 and finally International Westminster Bank in 1973. All the Spanish branches were closed in 1923–24, due to deteriorating economic conditions in Spain and discrimination against foreign banks. Control of the remaining branches was exercised from London, although between 1940 and 1944 contact with them was lost due to the German occupation.

Birkbeck Building and Freehold Land Society, formed in 1851, developed a large deposit-taking business that developed into banking activity. Cheque books were issued from 1858, and by 1872 the business was trading under the title of Birkbeck Bank. In 1910, when its balance sheet totalled £12.26 million and it had 112,817 accounts, the bank suffered a run. Continuing rumours about its financial position, and a climate of depreciation in gilt-edged securities, led to a suspension of payments. The Bank of England provided support for the immediate payment of 10 shillings in the pound to depositors, but as most of its deposits were held as long-term securities the bank lacked liquidity and went into receivership. In 1911, its goodwill and premises were purchased from the receiver by London County and Westminster Bank.

In 1917, bank officials decided to acquire the Ulster Bank (which continued to operate separately), with 170 branches throughout Ireland, and in 1918 bought Parr's Bank, with over 320 offices throughout England. These purchases made London County Westminster and Parrs (which became simply Westminster Bank Limited in 1923) the fifth-largest bank in England. The Parr's name survives in the Bloomsbury, Parr's Branch of National Westminster Bank at 214 High Holborn, London.

During the economic difficulties of the late 1920s and early 1930s, the bank kept tight centralised control over the continental branch of the business to avoid the dangers of too rapid an expansion in unfamiliar markets, but this policy stunted Westminster's international operations. It did mean that the bank escaped the bad debts and currency fluctuations that plagued many other banks between the world wars, allowing the domestic side of the business to grow steadily. The bank continued to expand through acquisition, namely:

Paid-up capital rose from £9 million in 1923 to £40.5 million in 1935. By 1939 there were 1,100 branches and at the time of the merger with National Provincial Bank in 1968, Westminster had 1,400 branches in England alone.

The portcullis used by the bank was one of the familiar badges of King Henry VII and derived from the arms of the royal City of Westminster, which also included the fess wavy, signifying the River Thames, derived from the arms of the County of London. The present National Westminster Bank continues to use the portcullis in its common seal (the official seal kept in accordance with section 40 of the Companies Act).

National Provincial Bank
The merger of Westminster and National Provincial Bank, announced in early 1968, shocked the British public and banking community. Although the Bank of England had indicated a willingness to allow mergers as part of a rationalisation process, no one had seriously believed it would permit mergers among the largest and most influential banks.

The District Bank (a 1962 National Provincial acquisition), National Provincial and Westminster Bank were fully integrated in the new firm's structure, while Coutts & Co. (a 1920 National Provincial acquisition), Ulster Bank and the Isle of Man Bank (a 1961 National Provincial acquisition) continued as separate operations. Duncan Stirling, chairman of Westminster Bank, became first chairman of the fifth-largest bank in the world. The statutory process of integration was completed in 1969 and the new company, National Westminster Bank, opened its doors for business on 1 January 1970.

See also

Westminster (typeface)

References

Bibliography

Ashby, J. F. The Story of the Banks Hutchinson & Co., London, 1934
Gregory, T. E. The Westminster Bank Through a Century Oxford University Press, 1936 
Mottram, R. H. The Westminster Bank 1836–1936 Westminster Bank, London, 1936
Reed, Richard National Westminster Bank: A Short History National Westminster Bank, London, 1989

External links
Catalogue of the Westminster Bank Guild archives, held at the Modern Records Centre, University of Warwick

NatWest Group
Defunct banks of the United Kingdom
Banks established in 1834
Banks disestablished in 1970
1834 establishments in the United Kingdom
British companies established in 1834